Charles Forelle is an American journalist who covers business for The Wall Street Journal.

He graduated from Phillips Academy, and from Yale University in 2002, and he was managing editor of the Yale Daily News.
He interned at The New York Observer and The Miami Herald.
He is married and lived in Boston, and worked in Brussels. He now works in London for the Journal, where he covers financial markets, working alongside David Enrich.

The work of Forelle and four other WSJ staff members earned The Wall Street Journal the 2007 Pulitzer Prize for Public Service. The award described the series as a "creative and comprehensive probe into backdated stock options for business executives that triggered investigations, the ouster of top officials and widespread change in corporate America". The lead articles in the series submitted for the prize were published March 18, 2006; Forelle wrote one ("How the Journal Analyzed Stock-Option Grants"); he and James Bandler wrote the other ("The Perfect Payday").

Awards
2007 Michael Kelly Award finalist 
 2007 Pulitzer Prize for Public Service, The Wall Street Journal
 2007 Gerald Loeb Award for Large Newspapers
 Philip Meyer Award for Precision Journalism
 2006 George Polk Award for business reporting
 National Headliner Award for business news coverage
 Gilbert and Ursula Farfel Prize for Investigative Journalism
 Goldsmith Prize for Investigative Reporting
 SABEW (Society of American Business Editors and Writers)
 Business Journalist of the Year.
 The Bob Consdidine award (Overseas Press Club of America) for Best newspaper or news service interpretation of international affairs

References

External links

American male journalists
The Wall Street Journal people
George Polk Award recipients
Gerald Loeb Award winners for Large Newspapers
Yale University alumni
Phillips Academy alumni
Living people
Year of birth missing (living people)
Place of birth missing (living people)